Tylocidaris is an extinct genus of echinoids that lived from the Early Cretaceous to the Eocene.  Its remains have been found in Europe and North America.

Sources

 Fossils (Smithsonian Handbooks) by David Ward (Page 177)

External links
Tylocidaris in the Paleobiology Database

Psychocidaridae
Prehistoric echinoid genera
Cidaroida genera
Cretaceous echinoderms
Paleocene echinoderms
Eocene animals
Prehistoric animals of Europe
Prehistoric echinoderms of North America
Early Cretaceous genus first appearances
Eocene genus extinctions